The Prophecy is the fourth album by American thrash metal band Defiance, released in 2009. Unlike the previous two albums, Void Terra Firma and Beyond Recognition, the album is much more straight forward thrash metal, almost similar to Product of Society.

Reception 
The album had some pretty lukewarm reviews by both critics and metal fans alike. For example, about.com responded to this album with, 

Themetalcrypt.com said, "Yet another 'Thrash Revival' album that contains a shitload of groove and yelling but very little actual Thrash."

The album also received favorable reviews for their efforts on what would ultimately be their last.  A perfect example of this warmer reception by critics could be read in the LordsofMetal.com review from late 2009, 

A similar exert taken from the review by AllMusic shows another positive option on the music,

Track listing

Lineup 
Steev Esquivel – vocals
Doug Harrington – lead/rhythm guitars
Jim Adams – lead/rhythm guitars
Mike Kaufmann – bass
Mark Hernandez – drums
Glen Alvelais – lead guitars

References 

2009 albums
Defiance (band) albums
Candlelight Records albums